Gionet is a surname. It may refer to:

 Alan Gionet, American journalist
 Samantha Leriche-Gionet (born 1985), French Canadian animator, illustrator, and comic strip author
 Simon Gionet, French Canadian film director

Surnames